Australian Sailing is recognised by World Sailing as the governing body for the sport of sailing in Australia.

It formed in 1950 as the Australian Yachting Federation at a meeting at  the Royal St. Kilda Yacht Club.
It is responsible for the administration, promotion and development of sailing in Australia. Australian Sailing a member-based organisation that represents the interests and provides services and support to over 360 clubs across Australia as well as more than 160 accredited Discover Sailing Centres.

Purpose
Australian Sailing's purpose is to grow sailing by leading, inspiring, and supporting sailors and their communities.

Clubs

Notable yacht clubs affiliated with Australian Sailing include the Cruising Yacht Club of Australia, Royal Perth Yacht Club, Royal Brighton Yacht Club, Royal Queensland Yacht Squadron, Royal Sydney Yacht Squadron, Royal Yacht Club of Victoria, Royal Freshwater Bay Yacht Club, Royal Geelong Yacht Club, Royal Prince Alfred Yacht Club and the Royal Yacht Club of Tasmania.

Affiliated Classes

Australian Sailing affiliates member associations including class associations for dinghys, keelboats, windsurfers, kite surfing and remote control boats.

Hall of Fame
In 2017, Australian Sailing Hall of Fame was established in conjunction with the Australian National Maritime Museum.

See also

 List of Australian sail racing associations
 :Category:Australian sailors
 :Category:Olympic sailors of Australia
 :Category:Australian sailors (sport)

References

External links
 
 World Sailing MNA Microsite

Australia
Sailing
Sailing in Australia
Australia
Sailing governing bodies
1956 establishments in Australia
Sports organizations established in 1956
Organisations based in Sydney